Troy is a ghost town in Lafayette County, Florida, United States that served as its county seat.

References

1845 establishments in Florida
Populated places in Lafayette County, Florida
Ghost towns in Florida